Ange Digbeu (born 29 June 1992) is a French professional footballer who plays as a defender for Championnat National 2 club Beauvais.

Personal life 
Born in France, Digbeu is of Ivorian descent.

References

External links

1992 births
Living people
Footballers from Paris
Association football defenders
French footballers
French sportspeople of Ivorian descent
Ligue 2 players
Championnat National players
Championnat National 2 players
Championnat National 3 players
OGC Nice players
ÉFC Fréjus Saint-Raphaël players
Football Bourg-en-Bresse Péronnas 01 players
AS Beauvais Oise players